Keiferia inconspicuella is a moth in the family Gelechiidae. It was described by Mary Murtfeldt in 1883. It is found in North America, where it has been recorded from the south-eastern and mid-western United States, north to New Jersey and Iowa and west to Nebraska and Texas.

The length of the forewings is 5-5.5 mm.

The larvae feed on Solanum carolinense and Solanum melongena. They mine the leaves of their host plant. Full-grown larvae are green and reach a length of 7–8 mm.

References

Keiferia
Moths described in 1883